Simone Moro (born 27 October 1967 in Bergamo) is an Italian mountaineer known for having made first winter ascents of four of the fourteen eight-thousanders: Shishapangma in 2005, Makalu in 2009, Gasherbrum II in 2011, and Nanga Parbat in 2016. No other climber has made more first winter ascents of an eight-thousander in history. He has also summited Everest four times, in 2000, 2002, 2006, and 2010.

Moro is also an experienced helicopter pilot. In 2013, he and two other rescue experts carried out the world's highest long-line rescue operation on a helicopter, on Lhotse, at 7800m. On 12 November 2015 he set a new flight altitude world record in an ES 101 Raven turboshaft-powered helicopter (6705m).

Early life 
Born in Bergamo, in northern Italy, to middle-class parents, Moro grew up in the borough of Valtesse and was actively encouraged by his father in his passion for the mountains. His father was an accomplished climber and cyclist and also fostered a lively and international environment around him. He started climbing on the Presolana and other massifs of the Bergamasque Alps at the age of 13. In 2003, at 35, he completed his university studies and graduated cum laude.

Climbing career 
Moro began his climbing activity on the Grigne near his home city. His father was his first mentor, and later Alberto Cosonni and Bruno Tassi. At that time he was primarily involved in rock climbing, an activity he has never given up. In 1992 he participated in his first Himalayan expedition, to Mount Everest. One year later Moro climbed Aconcagua. He made expeditions to other mountains in the 1990s, including Cerro Mirador and Makalu in 1993; Shishapangma and Lhotse in 1994, Kangchenjunga in 1995. In 1996 Moro climbed the west wall of Fitz Roy ( in Patagonia) in 25 hours from the base to the summit and back to the base. In 1997 he summited Lhotse. In  Winter of 1997 he attempted the South face of Annapurna. During this attempt, his climbing companions Anatoli Boukreev and Dimitri Sobolev died in an avalanche. He tried Everest again in 1998; summited four peaks Pik Lenin, Peak Korzhenevskaya, Ismoil Somoni Peak (formerly known as Pik Kommunizma), Pik Khan Tengri with young Kazakhstan guide Denis Urubko; then summited Everest with him in 2000 and Marble Wall in winter 2001.

In 2002 he summited three peaks: Mount Vinson, Cho Oyu and Everest; summited three peaks: Broad Peak, Elbrus and Kilimanjaro in 2003, summited Baruntse along a new route and tried Shishapangma and Annapurna in 2004; Batura and Batokshi peaks in 2005, Broad Peak in winter 2006 and 2007. In 2005 he achieved the first winter summit of Shishapangma, with Piotr Morawski. In 2006 he completed a solo south–north traverse of Everest descending from the top in five hours. 

In 2008 he made (with Hervè Barmasse) the first ascent of Beka Brakai Chhok ( Karakorum). The climbing was in pure alpine style and in 43 hours.

In January 2009 Moro made the first winter ascent of Makalu with Denis Urubko, and in February 2011 the first winter ascent of Gasherbrum II with Denis Urubko and Cory Richards.  In April 2013, Moro, while climbing Ueli Steck who was preparing for a traverse next spring of Everest and Lhotse, got into an altercation with disgruntled sherpas that according to The Guardian: "... went viral and Steck, wholly blameless in the affair, became severely depressed and disheartened".  In February 2016, Moro completed the first winter ascent of Nanga Parbat with Alex Txikon and Ali Sadpara. In February 2018, he completed the first winter ascent of Peak Pobeda, Sakha along with fellow Italian mountaineer Tamara Lunger.

Rescue missions
In May 2001 he tried to traverse Everest–Lhotse: during an attempt on the wall of Lhotse at 8000 metres he abandoned the climb to search, rescue, and save English alpinist Tom Moores. Moro was a recipient of the Fair Play Pierre de Coubertin trophy from UNESCO, the Civilian Gold Medal from Italian president Carlo Azeglio Ciampi and the David A. Sowles Memorial Award from the American Alpine Club. Tom Moores recalls his meeting with Moro this way:

In 2009, he bought a helicopter with his own money to carry out search and rescue operations in the Nepalese Himalayas for Nepalese people. He has piloted the helicopter several times to rescue alpinists, sherpas, trekkers, and people in remote areas.

Charitable work
In 2003, Moro projected and financed a school for 396 Sherpa children in the Nepalese village of Syadul. The objective of the project, carried with an Italian foundation, was to prevent early school-leaving in the area. The school was opened in 2005. It is located in a village a thousand meters above sea level and three hours from the nearest road.

Near the Nanga Parbat base camp, he financed, built, and donated to the Pakistani district of Gilgit Baltistan a small masonry building for local shepherds and a small hospital in the village of Ser.

Eight-thousanders climbed 
 1996, 2005 – Shishapangma, first winter ascent (2005)
 1997 – Lhotse
 2002 – Cho Oyu
 2003 – Broad Peak
 2009 – Makalu, first winter ascent
 2000, 2002, 2006, 2010 – Mount Everest
 2011 – Gasherbrum II, first winter ascent
 2016 – Nanga Parbat, first winter ascent

Bibliography 
 
 
 Moro, Simone (2016). Nanga (in Italian). Rizzoli. .

References

External links 

 
 Interview on planetmountain.com 

1967 births
Living people
Sportspeople from Bergamo
Italian mountain climbers